House of Steel: The Honorverse Companion is a military science fiction book, published by American company Baen Books on May 7, 2013.

The book includes  : 
 The story "I Will Build My House of Steel" by David Weber 
 color illustrations 
 and the "Honorverse Companion 1921 PD" 
 The Star Empire of Manticore
 Introduction
 Astrography
 History
 Government
 People
 Nonhuman Sentient Species
 The Royal Manticoran Navy
 The Royal Manticoran Marine Corps
 The Royal Manticoran Army
 The Protectorate of Grayson
 Introduction
 Astrography	
 History	
 Government
 People
 The Grayson Space Navy
 The Grayson Army
 Afterword
 Building a Navy in the Honorverse
 Frequently Asked Questions
 About BuNine
 About the Authors

References 

Science fiction anthologies
Honorverse books
2013 books